Morning Show was a Hungarian morning radio show that aired from 6 AM to 10 AM on Class FM in Hungary. The show started on 30 November 2009 and ended on 16 November 2016. It was hosted by Balázs Sebestyén, Ferenc Rákóczi and János Vadon. It has been the most popular morning radio show since 2011, and has won industry awards.

See also
 List of Hungarian-language radio stations
 Morning zoo

External links
 Official Site

References

Hungarian radio programs